AH 47 may refer to:

 National Highway 47 (India)
 New Hampshire Route 47, United States
 NH 47 (film), a 1984 Indian Malayalam film